Georgina Stoker (born 24 October 1985) is an English female professional squash player. She achieved her highest career ranking of 47 on December, 2006 during the 2006 PSA World Tour and last played for England women's national squash team during the 2017 PSA World Tour.

She is currently residing in the United States.

References 

1985 births
Living people
English female squash players
English people of Hong Kong descent
Hong Kong emigrants to England